Damascus School, also known as the Damascus Pioneer Craft School is an historic schoolhouse in Damascus, Oregon, United States, built in 1876. It is listed on the National Register of Historic Places. It is one of the oldest rural schoolhouses still standing in the state of Oregon. 

The school building is contemporarily home to the Damascus Fiber Arts School.

See also
National Register of Historic Places listings in Clackamas County, Oregon

References

External links

Damascus Fiber Arts School official site

1876 establishments in Oregon
Buildings and structures in Clackamas County, Oregon
School buildings completed in 1876
School buildings on the National Register of Historic Places in Oregon